Michael Meister (born 9 June 1961) is a German mathematician and politician of the Christian Democratic Union (CDU) who has been serving as a member of the Bundestag from the state Hesse since 1994. From 2018 until 2021 he also served as Parliamentary State Secretary at the Federal Ministry of Education and Research in the government of Chancellor Angela Merkel.

Political career 
Meister first became a member of the Bundestag in the 1994 German federal election. From 1994 until 1998, he was a member of the Committee on Urban Development, Housing and Regional Planning. From 2004 until 2013, he served as deputy chairman of the CDU/CSU parliamentary group under the leadership of successive chairpersons Angela Merkel (2004-2005) and Volker Kauder (2005-2013). In this capacity, he oversaw the group's initiatives on economic policy.

In the negotiations to form a Grand Coalition of the Christian Democrats (CDU together with the Bavarian CSU) and the Social Democrats (SPD) following the 2013 federal elections, Meister was part of the CDU/CSU delegation in the working group on financial policies and the national budget, led by Wolfgang Schäuble and Olaf Scholz. In the third cabinet of Chancellor Angela Merkel, he served as Parliamentary State Secretary at the Federal Ministry of Finance under minister Wolfgang Schäuble from 2013 until 2018. 

In the negotiations to form a coalition government under Merkel's leadership following the 2017 federal elections, Meister was part of the working group on urban development, led by Bernd Althusmann, Kurt Gribl and Natascha Kohnen.

Other activities

Corporate boards
 KfW, Ex-Officio Member of the Board of Supervisory Directors (2007–2014)
 German Investment Corporation (DEG), Member of the Supervisory Board (2014-2018)

Non-profit organizations
 German Federal Environmental Foundation (DBU), Member of the Board of Trustees (2019–2021)
 German Foundation for Peace Research (DSF), Member of the Board (2018–2022)
 Jewish Museum Berlin, Member of the Board of Trustees (2014-2018)

Political positions
In June 2017, Meister voted against Germany's introduction of same-sex marriage.

Ahead of the Christian Democrats’ leadership election in 2022, Meister publicly endorsed Helge Braun to succeed Armin Laschet as the party’s chair.

References

External links 

  
 Bundestag biography 

1961 births
Living people
Members of the Bundestag for Hesse
Members of the Bundestag 2021–2025
Members of the Bundestag 2017–2021
Members of the Bundestag 2013–2017
Members of the Bundestag 2009–2013
Members of the Bundestag 2005–2009
Members of the Bundestag 2002–2005
Members of the Bundestag 1998–2002
Members of the Bundestag 1994–1998
Parliamentary State Secretaries of Germany
Members of the Bundestag for the Christian Democratic Union of Germany